Red Empire may refer to
 Empire of Japan, known as the "Red Empire of the Pacific", existing from 1868 to 1947
 Soviet Empire, a term used by critics of the Soviet Union to refer to its perceived imperialist foreign policy
 7th Special Forces Group (United States), a brigade-sized United States Army unit 
 The Red Empire, a 2011 book by Joe McKinney